Clentiazem is a calcium channel blocker.

It is a chlorine derivative of diltiazem.

References

Calcium channel blockers
Benzothiazoles
Lactams
Chloroarenes
Acetate esters